Roscoelite is a green mineral from the mica group that contains vanadium.
The chemical formula is K(V3+, Al, Mg)2AlSi3O10(OH)2.
Crystals of roscoelite take on the monoclinic form, and are from the 2/m point group.
The appearance is semi transparent to translucent coloured olive brown to green brown.  The lustre is pearly.  The mineral shows pleochroism with X showing green-brown, and Y and Z axes showing olive-green colour.  The mineral was named after Henry Enfield Roscoe who first produced vanadium metal.

Chemical properties
Roscoelite is a muscovite with aluminium substituted with vanadium.  Vanadium can also be substituted by magnesium, iron, or manganese.

Physical properties
It is soft and the density is 2.93±0.01.  The unit cell has dimensions 
a = 526 pm 
b = 909 pm
c = 1025 pm, 
with an angle between axes of β=101.0°.  The tetrahedral cation-oxygen atom distance is 164.1 pm,  The distance from the cation to the oxygen in the octahedral plan is 202 pm.

Formation
Two kinds of mineral deposits contain roscoelite, either gold-silver-tellurium low temperature epithermal deposits where it occurs along with quartz, fluorite, pyrite and carbonates, or oxidized low temperature uranium-vanadium ores in sedimentary rocks, where it occurs with corvusite, hewettite, carnotite and tyuyamunite.  Roecoelite is considered a gangue mineral of no value when found with gold.  However it has also been used as a vanadium ore.

In the Mt. Kare mine in New Guinea the mineral occurs with gold and is an important maker of gold deposits. The fluid contained a high level of salt and also contained carbon dioxide, methane, carbonyl sulfide and other minor amounts of rock forming elements.

Occurrence
The mineral has been found in numerous places in US, Australia, Japan, Gabon, Fiji, New Guinea and Czech Republic.  In the United States, it was the principal vanadium ore mineral at the mines at Placerville, Colorado.  In Australia roscoelite has been found at Kalgoorlie, Radium Hill and the Kintore Open Cut at Broken Hill.

References

Potassium minerals
Mica group
Vanadium minerals
Monoclinic minerals
Minerals in space group 12